Soft Matter is a peer-reviewed scientific journal covering the science of soft matter. It is published by the Royal Society of Chemistry and the editor-in-chief is Darrin Pochan (University of Delaware, USA).

The journal was established in 2005. Initially it was published monthly, but as submissions increased it switched to 24 issues a year in 2009 and to 48 issues a year in 2012.

Abstracting and indexing 
The journal is abstracted and indexed in:
 Current Contents/Physical, Chemical & Earth Sciences
 Index Medicus/MEDLINE/PubMed
 Science Citation Index
 Scopus

According to the Journal Citation Reports, the journal has a 2021 impact factor of 4.046.

See also 
 List of scientific journals in chemistry

References

External links 
 

Biochemistry journals
Engineering journals
Materials science journals
Publications established in 2005
Royal Society of Chemistry academic journals
Weekly journals
English-language journals